Brackett's Minnesota Cavalry Battalion  was a Minnesota USV cavalry battalion that served in the Union Army during the American Civil War.

Service
Companies A, B, and C organized at Fort Snelling, Minnesota, as 1st, 2nd and 3rd Companies, Minnesota Light Cavalry, September to November, 1861. Ordered to Benton Barracks, Missouri, November, 1861, and attached to Curtis Horse, an Independent Regiment of Cavalry, which was later designated 5th Iowa Cavalry. Assigned as Companies G, I, and K. Duty at Benton Barracks, Missouri, until February, 1862. Moved to Fort Henry, Tennessee, February 8–11. Served unassigned, Department of the Tennessee, to November, 1862. District of Columbus, Kentucky, 13th Army Corps, Department of the Tennessee, to December, 1862. District of Columbus, Kentucky, 16th Army Corps, Department of the Tennessee, to June, 1863. 1st Brigade, Turchin's 2nd Cavalry Division, Army of the Cumberland, to October, 1863. 3rd Brigade, 2nd Division, Cavalry Corps, Army of the Cumberland, to December, 1863. 1st Brigade, 2nd Division, Cavalry Corps, Army of the Cumberland, to January 7, 1864. Detached from 5th Iowa Cavalry February 25, 1864, Designated Brackett's Battalion, Minnesota Cavalry.
Duty at Fort Snelling, Minnesota, to May 2, 1864. Attached to Pollock's 1st Brigade, District of Iowa, Department of the Northwest. Sully's Northwestern Indian Expedition June 4 to November 10, 1864. Battle of Killdeer Mountain July 28. Action in Battle of the Badlands, August 8–9. Fort Ridgley, Minnesota, until Spring, 1865. Sully's operations against Indians May to October, 1865. Patrol duty from Sioux City to Fort Randall, October, 1865, to May, 1866. Mustered out June 1, 1866.

Detailed Service
Companies A, B, and C were organized at Fort Snelling, Minnesota, as the 1st, 2nd and 3rd Companies, Minnesota Light Cavalry from September to November, 1861. They were ordered to Benton Barracks, Missouri, in November, 1861, and attached to Curtis Horse, an Independent Regiment of Cavalry, which was later designated 5th Iowa Volunteer Cavalry Regiment. The Minnesota Battalion was assigned as Companies G, I, and K. After duty at Benton Barracks, Missouri, until February, 1862., the battalion moved to Fort Henry, Tennessee, from February 8–11, 1862. Engaged in patrol duty during battle of Fort Donelson, Tennessee. Expedition to destroy railroad bridge over Tennessee River February 14–16. 1862. Duty at Fort Henry and Fort Heiman, Tennessee, until February 5, 1863, and at Fort Donelson, Tennessee, until June 5, 1863. Moved from Fort Henry to Savannah, Tennessee, March 25-April 1, 1862. Moved toward Nashville, Tennessee, repairing roads and erecting telegraph lines April 3–6. Advance on and siege of Corinth, Mississippi, April 29-May 30. Acting as escorts to Telegraph Corps, Lockridge Mills, May 5. Occupation of Corinth May 30, and pursuit to Booneville May 31-June 12. Duty at Humboldt until August, 1862. Scouting and protecting railroad. Action at Fort Donelson, Tennessee, August 25. Cumberland Iron Works August 26. Expedition to Clarksville September 5–9. New Providence September 6. Clarksville September 7. Scout toward Eddyville October 29-November 10. Expedition from Fort Heiman December 18–28. Fort Donelson February 3, 1863, Duty at Fort Donelson until June. Moved to Murfreesboro and Nashville, Tennessee, June 5–11. Scout on Middleton and Eagleville Pike June 10. Expedition to Lebanon June 15–17. Lebanon June 16. Middle Tennessee or Tullahoma Campaign June 23-July 7. Guy's Gap, Fosterville, June 25. Guy's Gap. Fosterville and Shelbyville, June 27. Occupation of Middle Tennessee until September. Moved to McMinnville September 6–8, and operating against guerrillas until October. Operations against Wheeler and Roddy September 30-October 17. Garrison Creek near Fosterville and Wartrace October 6. Sugar Creek October 9. Tennessee River October 10. At Maysville until January, 1864. Expedition from Maysville to Whitesburg and Decatur November 14–17, 1863, to destroy boats on the Tennessee River. Outpost duty on line of Tennessee River from south of Huntsville to Bellefonte, Alabama, November and December, 1863. The Minnesota volunteers reenlisted and achieved veteran status on January 1, 1864. Battalion returned to Minnesota on January 7, and was officially detached from 5th Iowa Cavalry Regiment on February 25, 1864, being designated Brackett's Battalion, Minnesota Cavalry at that time. The battalion remained in garrison at Fort Snelling until May 1864 when it was transferred to Sioux City, Iowa, moving there from May 2–25, 1864. It participated in Brigadier General Alfred Sully's Northwestern Indian Expedition against "hostile" Sioux west of the Missouri River from June 4, 1864 to November 10, 1864. The battalion marched to Fort Sully from June 4–15, 1864, and pursued Indians to the Badlands from July 19–28. Then it participated in the Battle of Tah Kah A Kuty or Killdeer Mountain, Dakota Territory on July 28, 1864. After that action it marched to Fort Rice from June 28 to July 7, 1864, then made the passage of the Badlands of Dakota Territory from August 3–18. During this time, the battalion fought in the engagement near the Little Missouri River at Two Hills, the Battle of the Badlands, Dakota Territory, from August 8–9, 1864. The Minnesota companies also helped in the rescue of Fisk's Emigrant train, from September 10–30, 1864. March on Yellowstone River in Montana Territory to Fort Union, Dakota Territory. The battalion spent the winter of 1864-1865 and the spring at Fort Ridgely, Minnesota and then served in Brigadier General Alfred Sully's operations against the Sioux from May to October, 1865. The Minnesotans spent October, 1865 until May, 1866 on patrol duty from Sioux City, Iowa to Fort Randall, Dakota Territory, with headquarters at Sioux City, Iowa before being mustered out on June 1, 1866.

Commander
 Major Alfred B. Brackett

Casualties and total strength
During service, Brackett's Cavalry Battalion lost 1 officer and 4 enlisted men killed in action or died of wounds received in battle and 6 enlisted men by disease, for a total of 11 fatalities.

References

External links
Brackett's Battalion in MNopedia, the Minnesota Encyclopedia
The Civil War Archive Website
 Minnesota Historical Society page on Minnesota and the Civil War

See also
List of Minnesota Civil War Units
5th Iowa Volunteer Cavalry Regiment

Units and formations of the Union Army from Minnesota
1861 establishments in Minnesota
Military units and formations established in 1861
Military units and formations disestablished in 1866